

Events
Approximate date – Britain's longest tramroad tunnel is opened at Pwll du near Blaenavon in South Wales. The Pwll Du Tunnel is more than a mile (2400 m) in length. Begun as a mineral adit, at this time it carries a horse-drawn double track plateway of approximately 2 ft (600 mm) gauge carrying material for Blaenavon Ironworks; next summer it will be incorporated in Thomas Hill's Tramroad.

Births

March births 
 March 26 - Herman Haupt, United States railroad civil engineer (d. 1905).

June births 
 June 20 - Silas Seymour, chief engineer and/or consulting engineer for several railroads in New York in the mid- to late 19th century (d. 1890).

July births 
 July 1 – Hugh J. Jewett, president of the Erie Railroad 1874–1884 (d. 1898).
 July 15 – John Fowler, British civil engineer (d. 1898).

October births 
 October 2 – Webster Wagner, founder of Wagner Palace Car Company (d. 1883).
 October 17 – Alexander Mitchell, president of Chicago, Milwaukee and St. Paul Railway 1864–1887 (d. 1887).

Unknown date births
 Matthew Baird, second owner of Baldwin Locomotive Works (d. 1877)
 Walter McQueen, Chief mechanical engineer for the Albany and Schenectady Railroad 1845–1850, Hudson River Railroad 1850–1852, and superintendent of Schenectady Locomotive Works 1852–1876 (d. 1893).

Deaths

References